Dynamite Cop, known in Japan as , is a 1998 beat 'em up video game published by Sega and initially released in arcades on Sega Model 2 hardware. It is the sequel to the 1996 game Dynamite Deka, which was released outside Japan as Die Hard Arcade. The game was ported to the Dreamcast and released internationally in 1999, this time without the Die Hard license. A second sequel, Asian Dynamite, was released only in arcades.

Gameplay

Dynamite Cop is a 3D beat 'em up for up to two players in which players play as either Bruno Delinger, Jean Ivy, or Eddie Brown and fight through levels on board a cruise ship and on a deserted island to save the President's daughter from a band of modern-day pirates led by Wolf "White Fang" Hongo, the main antagonist from the first game. The classic Sega arcade game Tranquilizer Gun (1980) is included as a bonus game on the Dreamcast version. Clearing all missions will enable you to play Tranquilizer Gun an unlimited number of times.

Appearances in other games
Its main character, Delinger, makes a cameo appearance in The House of the Dead 2 as a playable character via a special item obtainable in the original mode (present in home versions of The House of the Dead 2). Bruno Delinger also makes an appearance in Project X Zone as a solo unit character.

A chicken-leg from Golden Axe makes a cameo appearance on the Island stage.

Reception

In Japan, Game Machine listed Dynamite Cop on their August 1, 1998 issue as being the fourth most-successful arcade game of the month.

Jeff Chen reviewed the Dreamcast version of the game for Next Generation, rating it three stars out of five, and stated that "an entertaining, if somewhat last-generation-looking title".

The Dreamcast version received "mixed" reviews according to the review aggregation website GameRankings.  In Japan, Famitsu gave it a score of 30 out of 40.

References

External links
 

1998 video games
Arcade video games
Die Hard video games
Dreamcast games
Sega arcade games
Sega beat 'em ups
Video games about police officers
Video games about terrorism
Video games developed in Japan
Video games featuring female protagonists
Video games scored by Howard Drossin
PlayStation 2 games
3D beat 'em ups
Side-scrolling beat 'em ups